Gymnastics was contested at the 1982 Asian Games, held in New Delhi, India from 21 November 1982 to 24 November 1982. Only artistic events were contested.

Medalists

Men

Women

Medal table

References 

Medalists from previous Asian Games – Men – Individual
Medalists from previous Asian Games – Men – Team
Medalists from previous Asian Games – Women – Individual
Medalists from previous Asian Games – Women – Team

External links 
Results 22 November
Results 23 November
Results 24 November
Results 25 November

 
1982 Asian Games events
1982
Asian Games